Fairport is a village located in the Town of Perinton, which is part of Monroe County, New York, United States. It is also known as the "Crown Jewel of the Erie Canal". In 2005, it was named as one of the "Best Places to Live" by Money Magazine. The population of the Village of Fairport was 5,353 as of the 2010 census.

History
The town of Perinton was first settled by European Americans in the two flat areas of Perinton Center (Turk Hill and Ayrault Roads) and Egypt. The first settlers in Perinton were Glover Perrin, his wife Johanna and his brother Jesse. What was developed as the village of Fairport was a swampy area within the Town of Perinton until the 1820s, when it was drained by construction of the new Erie Canal. With the opening of the Canal, what was then known as Perrinsville quickly became a busy canal port with a reputation for being a "fair port." A further boon to the area's reputation as an industry and transportation center came with the construction of railroads in 1853.

In the 19th century industry moved into Fairport, including Deland Chemical (baking soda), Cobb Preserving (the predecessor to American Can), and the Trescott Company (fruit grading and packing systems). Deland Chemical later became Fairport Vinegar Works, makers of Certo brand pectin used to jell foodstuffs.

In the early 20th century, the Erie Canal was expanded and renamed the Barge Canal. (It reverted to its original name in 1992). Barge transportation rapidly declined as automobiles and trucks became popular. The town began to expand away from the canal. The Erie Canal is now used mainly for recreation.

Fairport acquired its name in the mid-19th century from a traveler on the Erie Canal who was overheard at Mallett's Tavern referring to the village as a fair port. Local legend has it that the same visitor vociferously complained the next morning that the Millstone Block Hotel had bedbugs, and he stormed out of Fairport, never to be seen again. The name, however, stuck. 

In 2005, Money Magazine and CNN/Money ranked Fairport as #62 on their "Best Places to Live" list.

In 2008, Relocate America included Fairport in their "Top 100 Places To Live" list.

The First Baptist Church of Fairport, Wilbur House, Minerva and Daniel DeLand House,  and Henry DeLand House are listed on the National Register of Historic Places.

Most residents of the Town of Perinton reside within both the Fairport Central School District and the Fairport postal district; as a result, it is common for Perinton residents to describe their place of residence as "Fairport" even if they live outside of the village.

Geography
Fairport is located at 43°5'58" North, 77°26'35" West (43.099433, -77.443015).

The total area is 3.09% water.

Although officially the name of only the village, "Fairport" is often used to refer to a large portion of the encompassing Town of Perinton as well. Both the Fairport Central School District and Fairport zip codes overlap closely with the borders of the Town of Perinton.

Demographics

As of the census of 2000, there were 5,740 people, 2,369 households, and 1,594 families residing in the village. The population density was 3,645.0 people per square mile (1,411.6/km2). There were 2,431 housing units at an average density of 1,543.7 per square mile (597.8/km2). The racial makeup of the village was 96.99% White, 0.73% African American, 0.12% Native American, 1.03% Asian, 0.00% Pacific Islander, 0.21% from other races, and 0.92% from two or more races. 1.38% of the population were Hispanic or Latino of any race.

There were 2,369 households, of which 33.2% had children under the age of 18, 53.4% were married couples living together, 10.7% had a female householder with no husband present, and 32.7% were non-families. 27.0% of all households were made up of individuals, and 7.9% had someone living alone who was 65 years of age or older. The average household size was 2.42 and the average family size was 2.96.

In the village, the population was spread out, with 25.2% under the age of 18, 6.1% from 18 to 24, 31.8% from 25 to 44, 25.1% from 45 to 64, and 11.8% who were 65 years of age or older. The median age was 38 years. For every 100 females, there were 92.4 males. For every 100 females age 18 and over, there were 91.1 males.

The median income for a household in the village was $53,375 and the median income for a family was $65,980. Males had a median income of $50,094 v. $30,431 for females. The per capita income for the village was $29,390. 3.3% of the population and 1.7% of families were below the poverty line. 2.2% of those under the age of 18 and 5.1% of those 65 and older were living below the poverty line.

Sports
Notable athletes to come out of Fairport include Tim Soudan in lacrosse (UMass, Rochester Knighthawks), Shawn Johnson in football (Duke University, Tennessee Titans), Steve Soja (Coastal Carolina University, River City Rascals, Mid-Missouri Mavericks, Gateway Grizzlies and Yuma Scorpions) and Ryan Szwejbka in baseball (University of South Carolina, Aberdeen Pheasants), Dave Cerny in lacrosse (SUNY Albany Hall of Fame), Dan Predmore in track and field (Cornell University Hall of Fame), Chris Collins in hockey (Boston College, Providence Bruins), Olympic Trial Finalist swimmer Jon Roberts (University of Minnesota), tennis player Marcus Fugate, Dhruv Tyagi in diving (Stanford University) and Ryan Kavanaugh in rowing (Columbia University). Skiers include Alpine Skier Brett Grabowski (NCAA All- American, University of Vermont); and Cross Country Skiers Bruce Likly (1984 Olympian; 4 time NCAA All-American, University of Vermont) and Sue Randall (St Lawrence University, NCAA finalist).
Over the past 13 years, Fairport has become a regional center for adaptive paddling and cycling along the canal-way. Erie Canal Boat Company and Rochester Accessible Adventures have transformed the area to provide inclusive recreation to people of all abilities.

Culture 

Much of the activity of Fairport revolves around the Erie Canal waterfront. The Fairport Village Landing, opened in 1977, and Packett's Landing, built in the early 1980s, are two of the main shopping, dining and gathering spots in the village. Both developments resulted from a controversial decision to raze much of the core of historic buildings in the center of the village in favor of the style of urban development then coming into vogue.

The Colonial Belle is a popular tour boat that offers canal cruises from Packett's Wharf on the south bank of the Erie Canal in downtown Fairport.

Fairport is the home of Fairport Canal Days <Fairport Canal Days Home Page>. This festival takes place the first full weekend of June each year and features many Rochester, Monroe County, New York area performers, including The Perinton Concert Band, The Rochester Scottish Pipe Band, and the Rochester Philharmonic Orchestra. Artists and artisans from more than a dozen states and Canada flock to Fairport to show their goods at the three-day festival. During Canal Days, a large portion of Main Street is blocked off and reserved for vendors and stands. The parking lot of Fairport Village Landing is also blocked off and used strictly for stands.

Fairport's calendar is filled with numerous other family-oriented activities. Each Tuesday during the summer the village hosts live entertainment. Thursday evenings see hundreds gather at the canalside gazebo at Kennelley Park to enjoy live music of a variety of musical styles and genres. Center Stage at Center Park, a large outdoor amphitheater just minutes from the village, hosts live stage performances, festivals and concerts throughout the summer. The village also hosts numerous seasonal festivals throughout the year as well, such as the Fairport Music and Food Festival.

Fairport also has its own Farmer's Market that takes place in the parking lot behind Bank of America at 58 South Main Street. It opens the first Saturday of May and closes the Saturday before Thanksgiving. It's open from 7 am to Noon, however it is not open the weekend of Canal Days. 
 
The Erie Canal towpath is a popular walking/biking path. The section from Rochester's Genesee Valley Park to the village of Fairport is one of the most popular sections on the entire  of the Erie Canal. In the Rochester area the towpath is a mix of pavement and crushed gravel.

Although less popular, the section heading east from Fairport is high quality and an excellent trail. Hikers, bikers, dog-walkers, and runners are common on this section. It takes about 30 minutes to cycle from Route 250 to Canandaigua Road on the towpath.

Perinton Park is a popular family-oriented park located on the banks of Erie Canal at Fairport Road (Route 31F) - the traditional east/west gateway into the village. The park is a short walk on the canal from the village. Nearby is the rowing boathouse for the Fairport Crew Club, an independent rowing club for local residents. The FCC boathouse is used to store rowing shells, whose teams can be seen practicing on the canal most days during the traditional canal season. Each September Fairport hosts the "Lift Bridge Regatta", a popular crew event featuring some of the top crew clubs in the Northeast.

The Fairport Red Raiders represent Fairport High School in all varsity sports. For decades their traditional rivals in football were the East Rochester Bombers, whom they played annually for the famed Little Brown Jug beginning in 1939. The tradition finally came to an end on October 30, 1987 when it was acknowledged by both districts that because Fairport's student enrollment had grown significantly larger than that of East Rochester, a competitive balance between the two schools was no longer sustainable.

The village of Fairport owns and operates a municipal power corporation called Fairport Electric. Incorporated in 1901, Fairport Electric provides electric power to its customers at lower rates than those charged by neighboring utilities. Fairport Electric has purchased power from the New York Power Authority since 1961.

Village of Fairport Parks
Kennelley Park
Perinton Park
Packett's Landing Wharf
Potter Park
Indian Hill Trail

Government

The Village Board is the local legislative body, consisting of the Mayor and four Trustees. Board members are elected in the November general elections and serve a term of four years.

The Village Justice, also elected in the November general elections for a four-year term, presides over the village court which settles criminal, civil, small claims, parking, vehicle and traffic cases that occur within the Village.

The Village Board selects a Village Administrator with responsibility for directing Village operations, including those of the Fairport Municipal Commission and for serving as budget director, zoning officer and public safety officer.

Serving under the Village Administrator and appointed by the mayor with Board of Trustees approval, are the clerk/treasurer, deputy clerk, deputy treasurer and building inspector/fire marshal.

Education
While the Fairport Central School District serves the village of Fairport (as well as the town of Perinton), only Brooks Hill Elementary School, Johanna Perrin Middle School and Minerva Deland are actually situated in the village. The town of Perinton contains Fairport High School, Martha Brown Middle School, Jefferson Avenue Elementary and Dudley/Northside Elementary School.

The Fairport Central School District has eight schools in total. Dudley Elementary School educates students in grades K - 2, and is attached to Northside Elementary School which educates students in grades 3 - 5. Jefferson Avenue Elementary and Brooks Hill Elementary Schools school serves students in grades K - 5 as well. Martha Brown Middle School and Johanna Perrin Middle School are for students grades 6 - 8. All of the students come together for grade 9 at Minerva Deland School. Then they all move on to Fairport High School to continue grades 10 - 12. The "Fairport Family" prides itself for being very close and integrating programs for all of the schools to participate in together. The beloved program, "Brotherhood Sisterhood Week," takes place in March every year for one week. It focuses on Civility, Awareness, Respect, and Embrace (CARE) in each of the schools. At the end of the week, high school students, who have been pen pals with elementary school students for about a month, visit their buddies to teach about CARE and do fun activities.

Fairport High School ranked 548 out of the 2,000 schools in Newsweek's list of America’s Best High Schools for 2013.

Notable people
 Cole Bardreau, NHL hockey player, New York Islanders 
Rick Beato, Musician, producer and YouTube personality.
 Brian Michael Bendis, comic book writer, spent summers in Fairport
 Ralph Bown, radio pioneer
 Paul Foster Case, occultist
 Don Davey, NFL football player, Green Bay Packers (1991–94), Jacksonville Jaguars (1995–97)
 Henry A. DeLand, founder of Stetson University in DeLand, Florida, lived in Fairport
 Andrea Nix Fine, 2013 Academy Award winner, documentary film "Inocente"
 Joe Manhertz, St. Bonaventure University Athletic Director
 Laura Nix, 2020 Academy Award nominated director, documentary short film "Walk Run Cha-Cha"
 Joseph Fornieri, historian and author
 Philip Seymour Hoffman, actor, 2006 Academy Award Winner (Best Actor in Capote)
 Vijay Iyer, jazz pianist
 Cory Johnson, journalist
 Noah Z. Jones, animator and creator of Fish Hooks
 Leo Lyons, owner-manager of Rochester Jeffersons founding NFL team (1920–25)
 Julia Nunes, singer-songwriter
 Lauren O'Connell, singer-songwriter, guitarist
 Kim Pegula, businesswoman and co-owner of the Buffalo Bills
 Sian Proctor, scientist, astronaut and tv personality, 1988 graduate of FHS
 Louise Slaughter, Former U.S. House of Representatives; Ranking Democrat, House Rules Committee
 Tim Soudan, professional lacrosse player

References

External links

 
 Village of Fairport, NY webpage
 Fairport Canal Days webpage
 Fairport on City-Data.com
 Perinton Community Center
Fairport Public Library

Villages in New York (state)
Erie Canal
Rochester metropolitan area, New York
Villages in Monroe County, New York